Pauline Chan (born 1956) is an Australian actress, director, screenwriter and producer.

Early life 
Born and raised 16 years in Vietnam, Pauline Chan was sent to Hong Kong during the Vietnam War. She is of Chinese descent. Chan attended high school, enrolled in drama school, and worked as an actress in Hong Kong. Later, she traveled to the United States and studied Film at the University of California, Los Angeles. In 1980, Pauline Chan moved to Sydney, Australia.

Career 
In 1987 she debut as Australian actress in the George Miller produced Australian TV mini-series Vietnam. In 1989 TV miniseries Bangkok Hilton, Pauline Chan has appeared as Kang playing a corrupt pretty warder near Nicole Kidman, Hugo Weaving and Denholm Elliott.

In 1991 at Torino International Festival of Young Cinema, Chan's Short film Dusty Hearts won the Special Mention Award in Category Short Film Competition.

In 1994 Pauline Chan wrote and directed the film Traps. She also directed, wrote and produced the 2011 film 33 Postcards.

Chan is set to direct the upcoming crime thriller Neponset Circle starring Guy Pearce and Jeffrey Dean Morgan.

Filmography

as Actress 

1987 Vietnam  TV mini-series 
1989 The Flying Doctors  TV series 
1989 Simon Templar – Fear in Fun Park  TV series 
1989 Bangkok Hilton  TV miniseries 
1989 Cassidy
1991 G.P.  TV series 
1992 The Girl from Tomorrow
1996 Little White Lies
1997 Paradise Road
1998 The Sugar Factory
2001 Sword of Honour

as Director 
1989 The Space Between the Door and the Floor
1990  'Hang Up'
1991 Dusty Hearts
1994 Traps (also writer)
1996 Little White Lies
2002   'Journey to Mongolia'
2003   'Tears and Fairytales'
2011 33 Postcards (also writer)

as Producer 

1997 'Sugar Factory' (feature film, company co-director)
2002 'Rush Hours 2' (feature film, production manager)
2002 'Journey to Mongolia' (documentary)
2003 'tears and Fairytales' (documentary)
2003 'Belly of the Beast' (feature, Assoc Producer)
2006 'Ultraviolet' (feature film, producer HongKong)
2009 The Last Dragon – Search for the Last Pearl
2011 ''33 Postcards'(feature film)
2017 'Butterflies Across the Sea (TV series, producer Australia)
2018 'The Gateway' (feature film, Executive Producer)

References and notes

External links 

 

1956 births
Australian film actresses
Australian television actresses
Australian film directors
Australian film producers
Australian women film directors
Hoa people
Hong Kong people of Hoa descent
Living people
Vietnamese emigrants to Hong Kong
Vietnamese emigrants to Australia
Australian people of Chinese descent
UCLA Film School alumni
Australian actresses of Asian descent